Stefan Mueller (born October 13, 1995) is an American professional soccer player who plays as a defender for Union Omaha in USL League One.

Career

College
Mueller attended Temple University, playing all four years for their varsity soccer team. Throughout his four years at the college, Mueller registered 70 appearances, scoring once and tallying four assists.

Senior
After graduating college, Mueller moved to Europe to play amateur soccer with TB Uphusen in Germany. In the summer of the following year, Mueller returned to the United States with the Long Island Rough Riders of USL League Two, making two appearances during the 2018 season.

In July 2018, Mueller returned to Europe, signing with National League North club Southport. He made his league debut for the club on August 7, 2018, playing the entirety of a 3-1 home defeat to Altrincham.

In March 2020, Mueller returned to the States once again, signing with USL League One club Tormenta FC. He made his competitive debut for the club on July 25, 2020, playing the entirety of a 2-2 home draw with the Chattanooga Red Wolves.

On March 8, 2022, Mueller was transferred to USL Championship side Rio Grande Valley FC for an undisclosed fee.

Mueller joined USL League One club Union Omaha on January 31, 2023.

References

External links
Stefan Mueller at Temple University Athletics

1995 births
Living people
Long Island Rough Riders players
Southport F.C. players
Tormenta FC players
Rio Grande Valley FC Toros players
Union Omaha players
USL League Two players
USL League One players
American soccer players
Soccer players from New York (state)
Association football defenders
American expatriate soccer players
People from East Northport, New York
Temple Owls men's soccer players
American expatriate soccer players in Germany
Expatriate footballers in England
American expatriate sportspeople in England